Tong Fei (born 25 March 1961) is a Chinese retired gymnast. He competed at 1984 Olympic Games, and won a silver medal in men's horizontal bar (score: 19.975). He also helped Chinese men's gymnastics team to win a silver medal in team competition.

References

Living people
1961 births
Chinese male artistic gymnasts
Olympic silver medalists for China
Gymnasts at the 1984 Summer Olympics
Olympic medalists in gymnastics
Asian Games medalists in gymnastics
Gymnasts at the 1982 Asian Games
Asian Games gold medalists for China
Asian Games silver medalists for China
Asian Games bronze medalists for China
Medalists at the 1982 Asian Games
Medalists at the 1984 Summer Olympics
Medalists at the World Artistic Gymnastics Championships
Olympic gymnasts of China
People from Ji'an
Gymnasts from Jiangxi
20th-century Chinese people